Western State College of Law at Westcliff University is a private, for-profit law school in Irvine, California.  It offers full and part-time programs and is approved by the American Bar Association. Western State pays a fee to receive services from Association of American Law Schools (AALS).

History

Western State College of Law was founded in 1966 in Orange County, California. In 1987, the school applied for accreditation with the American Bar Association (ABA). Although the school was unsuccessful in this attempt, it was at the time accredited by the Western Association of Schools and Colleges and by the California State Committee of Bar Examiners (CBE). The accreditation by the CBE made graduates eligible to sit for the California Bar Examination.

By 1990, Western State had expanded to three campuses in California including locations in Fullerton, Irvine and San Diego. At that time, the school was the largest law school in California. In 1995, Western State again began pursuing accreditation with the ABA for all three of its campuses. In the latter half of the 1990s, the school underwent several changes as part of the accreditation process. In 1995, the school's San Diego campus became the independently owned Thomas Jefferson School of Law and the following year, the school closed its Irvine location and consolidated students to its Fullerton campus. In 1998, the school received provisional accreditation from the ABA and opened a new law library.

In 2000, the college's owners sold Western State to Argosy Education Group, which owned the school for a year before it was purchased by Education Management Corporation. Western State was granted full accreditation with the ABA in 2005, and became the third for-profit law school to receive ABA approval. In April 2012, the school was incorporated as one of the colleges of Argosy University and officially changed its name to Western State College of Law at Argosy University. The same year, the school sold its property to California State University, Fullerton for roughly $18 million. In January 2016, the campus moved to Irvine, California.

In October 2017, it was announced that the college of law was sold, along with the rest of Argosy University, to the Dream Center Foundation, a subsidiary of the Dream Center megachurch. The transaction was funded in part by the Najafi Companies, a private equity firm.  Critics have claimed that the sale and shift to non-profit status was designed to evade consumer protection regulations focused on for-profit institutions.

In 2019, a federal court approved Westcliff University's plan to purchase the school and revert it to for-profit status.  The ABA allowed continued accreditation under the ownership of Westcliff University in December 2019.

Academics

Programs
Western State offers both full-time and part-time programs. The school offers two areas of focus through their Business Law Center and their Criminal Law Practice Center, which are aimed at preparing graduates for a career in business or criminal law through additional training, internships and networking with lawyers.  The law school also offers certificates in Immigration Law, Family Law, and Real Estate.

, the school had 274 full-time students and 149 part-time students, and 61 members of faculty.

Bar passage
The school's bar pass rate was 48% for first-time takers of the July, 2022 California bar exam, ranking eighteenth out of eighteen California ABA accredited law schools.  The Ultimate Bar Pass Rate, which the ABA defines as the pass rate for graduates who sat for a bar exam within two years of graduating, is 76.63% for the Class of 2018.

Rankings
U.S. News & World Report ranks the school in the quartile known as #148-194.  Among all law schools, Western State has the third-highest Diversity Index, as reported by U.S. News & World Report.  In addition, it received an A+ for Diversity in National Jurist's Best Law Schools.

Costs
The total cost of attendance (indicating the cost of tuition, fees, and living expenses) at the Western State College of Law for the 2018-19 academic year is $63,692 for a student living at home and $77,126 for a full-time student that is self-supporting.

Post-graduation employment

According to Western State's ABA-required disclosures, 81.2% of the Class of 2021 obtained employment nine months after graduation.  76.5% of the class obtained JD-required or JD-advantage employment.  Excluding solo practitioners, 55.3% of the class obtained full-time, long-term, JD-required employment.

Notable alumni

 Anthony Adams, a former member of the California State Assembly 
 Leslie Alexander (businessman), former owner of the Houston Rockets 
 Vito Barbieri, an Idaho state representative 
 Roger Benitez, a United States District Judge of the United States District Court for the Southern District of California 
 Bob Chandler, a former American football player 
 Bonnie Dumanis, the District Attorney for San Diego County 
 Michael Dvorak, former Indiana state representative and St. Joseph County, Indiana Prosecutor
 Mike Garrett, a former American football player and former athletic director at the University of Southern California 
 George Gascón, the District Attorney for Los Angeles County and the former District Attorney for San Francisco 
 Duncan Hunter, a former member of the United States House of Representatives and 2008 Presidential candidate 
 Ross Johnson, a former long-time California state legislator
 Mangala Moonesinghe, a member of the Parliament of Sri Lanka and Ambassador 
 Nguyen Cao Ky Duyen, a Vietnamese-American personality and co-host of Thuy Nga's Paris by Night shows 
 Ruth Parasol, the founder of PartyGaming
 Dick Walsh, a former Major League Baseball executive
 George O. Wood, the General Superintendent of Assemblies of God

References

External links
 

Educational institutions established in 1966
Universities and colleges in Orange County, California
ABA-accredited law schools in California
For-profit universities and colleges in the United States
Education in Fullerton, California
Education Management Corporation
Schools accredited by the Western Association of Schools and Colleges
Western State University College of Law alumni
1966 establishments in California
Private universities and colleges in California